Joseph Henry O'Neill was a Major League Baseball pitcher.

After his playing career ended, O'Neill spent two seasons as a minor league baseball manager.

Sources

1892 births
1969 deaths
Baseball people from Ontario
Canadian expatriate baseball players in the United States
Major League Baseball pitchers
Philadelphia Athletics players
Shreveport Gassers players
Salt Lake City Bees players
Hollywood Stars players
Minor league baseball managers
Major League Baseball players from Canada
Canadian baseball players
Canadian sportspeople of Irish descent